Bad and Crazy is a South Korean television series. Directed by Yoo Seon-dong and co-produced by Studio Dragon and Mink Entertainment, it features Lee Dong-wook, Wi Ha-joon, Han Ji-eun, and Cha Hak-yeon in main roles. This iQIYI original series depicts the story of a competent but corrupt detective whose life is thrown into chaos by a mysterious, justice-seeking entity. It premiered on tvN & iQIYI on December 17, 2021 and aired on every Friday and Saturday at 22:40 (KST) till January 28, 2022.

Synopsis
The story is about a corrupt yet practical detective who manifests a split personality who harbours a sense of justice.
Su-yeol (Lee Dong-wook) works as a police officer. He is competent at his job, but he also has questionable ethics. He will do anything to achieve success. Due to his ambitious personality, he has received promotions in a short period of time. His smooth life suddenly changes with the appearance of K (Wi Ha-joon), who is a righteous person. 
Meanwhile, Lee Hui Gyeom (Han Ji-eun) works as a police lieutenant on the drug squad at the Mooui Police Department.

Cast

Main
 Lee Dong-wook as Ryu Soo-yeol/In Jae-hui
 Nam Do-yoon as young In Jae-hui
A corrupt police detective who changes into a champion for justice. He is competent at his job, but he also has questionable ethics. He will do anything to achieve success. Due to his ambitious personality, he has received promotions in a short period of time. His smooth life suddenly changes with the appearance of K.

Wi Ha-joon as K
A man with a crazy sense of justice. He is a righteous person, but also crazy. Whenever he faces injustice, he meets it with a fist.

 Han Ji-eun as Lee Hui-gyeom
A detective of the drug crime investigation team. Hee Kyum works as a police lieutenant on the drug squad at the Mooui Police Department. She is also a righteous person and enthusiastic at her job. She is the ex-girlfriend of Soo-Yeol. She is a detective with a passion index, who applied to the drug investigation world to enjoy the joy of hitting the bad guys. She comes from a wealthy background and had a good education, but is considered the “black sheep” of the family. She also constantly butts heads with Soo Yeol.

 Cha Hak-yeon as Oh Kyeong-tae
The youngest member of the anti-corruption investigation department of the National Police Agency. He is an infinitely friendly and warm-hearted person who can not pass by people in trouble and approach them first and offer a helping hand. He has a clean and pure side without any wrinkle, but he will appear as an ardent police officer, who does not let go of the string of doubt with his tenacity and tenacity who does not miss a single clue in his work, increasing the tension of the play and revealing a strong presence.

Supporting

Munyang Police Agency
Anti-Corruption Investigation Division 
 Sung Ji-ru as Bong-pil, chief of the anti-corruption investigation department of the Munyang Police Agency
 Cha Si-won as Jae-seon, 2nd Team Inspector of Anti-Corruption Investigation Division

Drug Crime Investigation Division
 Lee Hwa-ryong as Gye-sik, Narcotics Crime Investigation Team, Drug Crime Investigation Team 1, Team Leader
 Shin Joo-hwan as Heo Jong-goo, Narcotics Crime Investigation Team, Drug Crime Investigation Team 1
 Jo Dong-in as Chan-ki Jeong, Narcotics Crime Investigation Team, Drug Crime Investigation Team 1
 Lee Sang-hong as Do In-beom, homicide detective

Drug organization
 Kim Hieo-ra as Boss Yong, drug gang leader
 Won Hyun-jun as Andrei, Boss Yong's assistant

Others
 Lee Joo-hyeon as Tak Min-su
 Kang Ae-shim as Seo Seung-suk, Soo-yeol's adoptive mother
 Kim Dae-gon as Ryu Dong-yeol, Soo-yeol's adoptive older brother
 Park Seon-hu as young Ryu Dong-yeol
As a middle school student, he looked and found Jae-hui sleeping in the front of his house in the morning.
 Lim Ki-hong as Assemblyman Do Yu-gon
 Nam Woo-joo as Jeong Hyeon-soo, an equipment manufacturing technician
 Park Se-joon as Nam Eun-seok, Prosecutor trainee at the Munyang District Prosecutor's Office.
 Jung Sung-il as Shin Ju-hyeok / Jeong Yun-ho, a therapist of a youth center, and manipulator of Soo-yeol since his youth.
 Jung Yoon-seok as young Jeong Yun-ho
 Park Ji-hong as Su Jan, the head of a criminal organization led by Chief Masa, although he is a foreign worker. He speaks Korean at a high level freely.
 Park Min-sang as Shim Jeong-hun

Special appearance
 Park Seo-yeon as Baek Young-joo  (ep. 8)
Yang Dae-hyuk as Park Seong-gwan
 Kim Seon-hwa as Doctor Hong

Production
On March 31, 2021 it was announced that Yoo Seon-dong, the director of OCN 2020 TV series The Uncanny Counter, would be directing OCN's Bad and Crazy. One day later it was reported by Lee Dong-wook's agency, King Kong by Starship that he is considering the offer of appearing in the series positively. The series is third drama collaboration between iQIYI and Studio Dragon, after My Roommate Is a Gumiho and Shooting Stars (currently under production), with Mink Entertainment (Drama Stage: Anthology) joining as a co-producer. It was planned to air on OCN but later on broadcast channel was changed to tvN. On May 19, 2021 it was reported that Han Ji-eun received an invitation to appear in the series. On June 14, Cha Hak-yeon's agency, Fifty OneK reported that he was considering the proposal to appear in the series. On September 1, Lee Dong-wook and Han Ji-eun were confirmed to cast as main lead in the TV series.

Script reading site was revealed by releasing stills on October 27, 2021.

Filming
On August 8, filming of the series took place at Ochang-eup, Cheongwon-gu, North Chungcheong Province.

Release
The series was released on December 17, 2021 and aired every Friday and Saturday at 22:40 (KST). It is also available on iQIYI in 191 countries for streaming.

Original soundtrack

Part 1

Part 2

Part 3

Part 4

Viewership

Notes

References

External links 
  
 Bad and Crazy at iQIYI
 Bad and Crazy at Naver 
 Bad and Crazy at Daum 
 
 

2021 South Korean television series debuts
2022 South Korean television series endings
Korean-language television shows
TVN (South Korean TV channel) television dramas
Television series by Studio Dragon
South Korean mystery television series
Dissociative identity disorder in television